Sugoli is a dessert prepared with the must of red grapes, flour and sugar, cooked slowly and then left to cool. The sugoli can be served cool, like a pudding, or preserved in a jar like jam. It is a typical dessert in Northern Italy.

History 
In ancient times, the sugoli was prepared exclusively during the harvest period with only must and flour, recent recipes often also include the addition of additional sugar in addition to that of the grapes themselves. It can be enjoyed alone, or as an accompaniment to the sbrisolona cake or with the same wine used for its preparation such as Lambrusco del Reggiano, Lambrusco Mantovano or Malvasia dei Colli Piacentini.

The sügol (in the Mantuan dialect) has acquired the status of "De.C.O." in 2021 (Denominazione comunale d'origine), by resolution of the municipality of Gonzaga. This version of the sugoli takes the name of crepada because it is cooked until the skin of the grapes cracks.

See also
 List of desserts
 

Italian desserts

References